Levi Johnson Dean (1878-1951) was a West Virginia-based architect.

Biography 
He was born in Gassaway, Braxton County, West Virginia in 1878. His
father, George W. Dean, served in the Confederate army and was a boat builder and millwright.  His mother was Mary Jane Davis and he was one of thirteen children.  Levi J. Dean married Ada Leonora Johnson in 1901, and they had three
children. Following Ada's death in 1910, he married Susie Ada Turner in 1912, and they had three children. Two of these, Keith and Brooks, became architects and practiced with Levi in the Huntington firm of Dean and Dean.

Dean studied architecture in Scranton, Pennsylvania. He began his practice, with mechanics,
in Charleston and relocated to Huntington in 1906. He briefly formed a partnership, but later went into business alone in 1910.

Dean designed and built an office for himself in 1927 in east Huntington, in the Moorish Revival style. After the sons joined the firm the offices were relocated to downtown Huntington.

Levi Dean completed a large number of commissions in his day. His work is distributed throughout West Virginia and into Kentucky and Ohio. He worked in practically every county in West Virginia.  The majority of his commissions were school buildings and churches. He also did a large number of banks, county courthouses and additions, and private residences.  The majority of the residential commissions were centered in Huntington, where he had a loyal following. During the Depression he performed a number of commissions for the Works Progress Administration.

Selected works

Individual listings on the National Register of Historic Places
 1924-1925: Ricketts House (Huntington, West Virginia), listed on the National Register of Historic Places in 1994.
 1940: R. T. Price House, Williamson, West Virginia, listed on the National Register of Historic Places in 1991.
 1940: Nicholas County Courthouse, Summersville, West Virginia, listed on the National Register of Historic Places in 1991.

Contributing properties to historic districts
 Clendenin Historic District
 Downtown Richwood Historic District
 Matewan Historic District
 Ripley Historic District

References

External links
Edward Tucker Architects, Inc., biography of Levi Johnson Dean

 https://www.findagrave.com/memorial/58978727/levi-johnson-dean

1878 births
20th-century American architects
Architects from West Virginia
People from Gassaway, West Virginia
Year of death missing